Warren Historic District, is a national historic district located at Warren, Warren County, Pennsylvania. The district includes 587 contributing buildings, 5 contributing sites, and 3 contributing objects in the central business district and surrounding residential areas of Warren.  The buildings are in a variety of popular architectural styles including Greek Revival and Italianate.  Notable buildings include the flatiron National City Bank Building (1891), Conewango Club, Elks Club, Trinity Episcopal Church (1895-1896), First Presbyterian Church (1895-1896), and former Swedish Lutheran Church (1916).  The contributing objects are a bronze statue of General Joseph Warren (1912), Soldiers and Sailors Monument (1909), and Civil War memorial (1922).  Located in the district and separately listed are the John P. Jefferson House, Struthers Library Building, Warren Armory, Warren County Courthouse, Wetmore House, and Woman's Club of Warren.

It was added to the National Register of Historic Places in 1999.

Gallery

References

Historic districts on the National Register of Historic Places in Pennsylvania
Greek Revival architecture in Pennsylvania
Italianate architecture in Pennsylvania
Buildings and structures in Warren, Pennsylvania
National Register of Historic Places in Warren County, Pennsylvania